Mamatha Maben (born 15 November 1970) is an Indian former cricketer who has played as an all-rounder, batting right-handed and bowling right-arm medium. She appeared in four Test matches and 40 One Day Internationals for India between 1993 and 2004, including playing at the 1993 World Cup and captaining the side in 2003 and 2004. She played domestic cricket for Karnataka, Railways and Air India.

Since retiring, she has served as the head coach of both the Bangladeshi and Chinese women's national sides.

She became the oldest ever woman cricketer to take a maiden five wicket haul in an ODI, at the age of 33 years and 162 days, at the 2004 Women's Asia Cup against Sri Lanka. Her figures in that match, 6/10, are also the best bowling figures in an innings for India in a WODI.

References

External links
 
 

1970 births
Living people
Cricketers from Bangalore
Indian women cricketers
India women Test cricketers
India women One Day International cricketers
Indian women cricket captains
Karnataka women cricketers
Railways women cricketers
Air India women cricketers
South Zone women cricketers
West Zone women cricketers
Indian cricket coaches